Sankt Lukas Stiftelsen is a Deacon institution located at Bernstorffsvej 20 in Hellerup, Gentofte Municipality,  Copenhagen, Denmark.

History
Sankt Lukas Stiftelsen was founded by Isabelle Brockenhuus-Løwenhielm and pastor Vilhelm Kold from Indre Mission on  8 May 1900. Its current premises were inaugurated in 1932. The land had previously belonged to the Lundegaard estate. The buildings were designed by the architect  Valdemar Birkmand and Aage Rafn.

Today
Sankt Lukas Stiftelsen comprises a home for the elderly, a daycare, a hospice and a cohousing community. The complex also comprises a chapel.

People

Protectors
 1934 – 1952: Queen Alexandrine
 1953 – 1972: King Frederik IX
 1973 – 2000: Queen Ingrid
 2001 – Queen Margrethe II

Chairmen
 1898 – 1926: O. Oxholm
 1926 – 1932: Vilhelm Kold
 1932 – 1937: E. Hvidberg
 1937 – 1940: Kai Jensen
 1940 – 1947: Hj. Cortsen
 1947 – 1966: H.W. Sprechler
 1966 – 1977: Poul Hartling
 J.B. Leer Andersen
 1978 – 1992: Henning Palludan
 1992 – 1998: C.C. Jessen
 1999 – 2007: Arne Oluf Andersen 
 2007 – 2008: Steen Hildebrandt
 2008 – 2014: Arne Oluf Andersen 
 2014 – Nina Berrig

References

External links

 Official website

1900 establishments in Denmark
Buildings and structures in Gentofte Municipality
Church of Denmark societies and organizations
Organizations established in 1900